Politics of Mauritius takes place in a framework of a parliamentary democracy. The separation of powers is among the three branches of the Government of Mauritius, namely the legislative, the executive and the Judiciary, is embedded in the Constitution of Mauritius.

Being a Westminster system of government, Mauritius's unicameral house of parliament officially, the National Assembly, is supreme. It elects the President and the Prime Minister. While the President is voted by a single majority of votes in the house, the Prime Minister is the MP who supports a majority in the house.

The President is the Head of State while the Prime Minister has full executive power and is the Head of Government who is assisted by a council of Ministers. Mauritius has a multi-party system.

Historically, Mauritius's government has been led by the Labour Party or the MSM for the exception of short periods from 1982 to 1983 and 2003–2005 where the MMM was at the head of the country. L'Alliance Lepep, a coalition of several political parties including MSM, Muvmen Liberater and PMSD, won the 2014 elections. Two years into the political term, the PMSD announced their resignation from the coalition government on 19 December 2016, and joined the ranks of the opposition. On 23 January 2017, the then Prime Minister, 86-year-old Sir Aneerood Jugnauth, a key political figure in Mauritian politics who has previously served several political terms spanning over many decades, announced that he was stepping down as Prime Minister. Following the Westminster tradition, the leader of the governing party (MSM party) in the coalition government, Pravind Jugnauth who is Sir Aneerood Jugnauth's son and then Minister of Finance, was sworn in as Prime Minister. Although Sir Aneerood Jugnauth resigned as Prime Minister, he is still serving as Minister Mentor, Minister of Defence, Minister for Rodrigues.
Mauritius' ruling Militant Socialist Movement (MSM) won more than half of the seats in 2019 parliamentary election, securing incumbent Prime Minister Pravind Kumar Jugnauth a new five-year term.

Legislative branch
The president and vice president are elected by the National Assembly for five-year terms. They form part along with the Speaker of the National Assembly, the legislative offices which under the constitution have the final decision and last word on any legislative matter including the laws of Mauritius. Most of the work is executed by the Executive Branch which consists of the Cabinet of Ministers, Leader of the Opposition and also other members of the parliament.

Executive branch
Another important structure of the government of Mauritius is the executive branch. The Prime Minister is appointed by the president and is responsible to the National Assembly. The Council of Ministers is appointed by the president on the recommendation of the prime minister. The Council of Ministers (cabinet), responsible for the direction and control of the government, consists of the prime minister (head of government), the leader of the majority party in the legislature, and about 24 ministers including one Deputy Prime Minister and/or one Vice Prime Minister.

The Executive branch being with the Cabinet have 4 most powerful executive offices, Prime Minister, Deputy Prime Minister and 2 offices of Vice Prime Minister. They have the executive power and authority over the cabinet and also help the Prime Minister in his tasks and responsibilities.

|President
|Prithvirajsing Roopun
|Independent
|2 December 2019
|-
|Prime Minister
|Pravind Jugnauth
|Militant Socialist Movement
|23 January 2017
|}

Power sharing
In Mauritius, Prime Minister enjoys significant power whereas the President has a mostly ceremonial role. The President as head of state resides in a historical Chateau laid on 220 hectares of land and the Prime Minister resides in the much smaller Clarisse House. Nevertheless, the Prime Minister is the chief executive. He is responsible for any bill sent to the President from the assembly. He presides over all cabinet ministers and is the first adviser of the President. He is the head of government and it is on his advice that the President shall appoint any person in the government.

Order of precedence

This is a list of ceremonial precedence for the Mauritian government:
 The President
 The Prime Minister
 The Vice President
 The Deputy Prime Minister
 The Chief Justice
 The Speaker of the National Assembly
 The Leader of the Opposition
 The Former Presidents,  Former Governor-Generals and Queen Elizabeth II King Charles III
 The Former Prime Minister
 The Vice Prime Ministers
 The Ministers
 The Former Vice President
 The Government Chief Whip
 The Chief Commissioner of Rodrigues
 The Parliamentary Private Secretaries
 The Secretary to Cabinet and Head of the Civil Service
 Financial Secretary/Secretary for Home Affairs/Secretary for Foreign Affairs
 Dean of the Diplomatic Corps/Heads and Acting Heads of Diplomatic
 Missions/Representatives of International and Regional Organisations
 The Senior Puisne Judge
 The Solicitor General/Puisne Judges/Senior Chief Executives
 The Chief of Protocol
 The Commissioner of Police
 The Permanent Secretaries/Ambassadors/Secretary to President
 The Deputy Speaker/Members of the National Assembly
 The Heads of Religious Bodies
 Holders of G.O.S.K. and/or persons knighted by the King
 Lord Mayor of Port-Louis/Mayors/Chairpersons of District Councils
 Consul General/Consuls/Honorary Consuls General/Honorary Consuls

Judicial branch
Mauritian law is an amalgam of French and British legal traditions. The Supreme Court—a chief justice and five other judges—is the highest local judicial authority. There is an additional higher right of appeal to the Judicial Committee of the Privy Council. Members of the Judicial Committee of the Privy Council have been located in Mauritius since the end of 2008, as part of a plan to lower the costs of appeal.

The present Chief Justice of the Supreme Court is, Rehana Mungly-Gulbul who succeeded Ashraf Caunhye in 2021.

See also
 List of political parties in Mauritius
 Prime Minister of Mauritius
 Elections in Mauritius

References